Dave Burke may refer to:

 David Burke (politician) (born 1967), Ohio politician
 Dave Burke (Australian footballer) (1916–1987), Australian rules footballer